Alexandrovka is a rural locality (a selo) in Kriushanskoye Rural Settlement, Paninsky District, Voronezh Oblast, Russia. The population was 513 as of 2010. There are 6 streets.

Geography 
Alexandrovka is located on the Smychok River, 40 km southwest of Panino (the district's administrative centre) by road. Kriusha is the nearest rural locality.

References 

Rural localities in Paninsky District